Keith Holland Parker (born 1932), is a former athlete who competed for England and later The Bahamas and was a coach for the Bahamas.

Athletics career
He represented England in the long jump at the 1958 British Empire and Commonwealth Games in Cardiff, Wales.

Coaching
He coached the Bahamas National Teams at Four Olympic Games, five World Championships, six Pan American Games and four Commonwealth Games.

Personal life
He moved to the Bahamas in 1959 to teach.

References

1932 births
English male long jumpers
Athletes (track and field) at the 1958 British Empire and Commonwealth Games
Living people
Commonwealth Games competitors for England